Chen Changjie (2 June 1892 – 7 April 1968) was a KMT general from Fujian.

References

1892 births
1968 deaths
National Revolutionary Army generals from Fujian
People from Fuzhou
Suicides during the Cultural Revolution